Beautiful Mind or Beautiful Minds may refer to:

Beautiful Minds (album), a 2008 collaborative album from rappers Killah Priest and Chief Kamachi
Beautiful Minds (TV programme), a 2010–2012 British documentary television programme that aired on BBC Four
Beautiful Minds (film), a 2021 French film

See also
Beautiful Mind (album), a 2022 studio album by Rod Wave
A Beautiful Mind (disambiguation)